Belgorodsky (masculine), Belgorodskaya (feminine), or Belgorodskoye (neuter) may refer to:
Belgorodsky District, a district of Belgorod Oblast, Russia
Belgorodsky (rural locality), a rural locality (a settlement) in Tula Oblast, Russia
Belgorod Oblast (Belgorodskaya oblast), a federal subject of Russia
Belgorodskoye, a rural locality (a selo) in the Jewish Autonomous Oblast, Russia